Whisking may refer to:
 The use or action of a whisk
 Movement of the whiskers in some animal species